Ronnie Harrison Jr. (born April 18, 1997) is an American football strong safety for the Cleveland Browns of the National Football League (NFL). He played college football at Alabama and was drafted by the Jacksonville Jaguars in the third round of the 2018 NFL Draft.

Early years
Harrison played both quarterback and safety at Florida State University School. As a senior, he had 39 tackles on defense and 2,076 passing yards with 13 touchdowns, 1,015 rushing yards and 16 rushing touchdowns on offense. Harrison committed to the University of Alabama to play college football.

College career
As a true freshman at Alabama in 2015, Harrison was a backup, recording 17 tackles, two interceptions, and one sack. As a sophomore, he took over as the starter, recording 86 tackles, two interceptions, and one touchdown.

Statistics

Professional career
On January 11, 2018, Harrison announced his decision to forgo his remaining eligibility and enter the 2018 NFL Draft. Harrison attended the NFL Scouting Combine in Indianapolis, but opted to only perform the broad jump and vertical jump. On March 7, 2018, he attended Alabama's pro day and performed the 40-yard dash, 20-yard dash, and 10-yard dash. Harrison received interest and was regarded as a top prospect at his position due to his combination of size and athleticism. He attended visit and private workouts with multiple teams, including the New York Giants, Pittsburgh Steelers, Detroit Lions, Tennessee Titans, Jacksonville Jaguars, Minnesota Vikings, New England Patriots, Cincinnati Bengals, Carolina Panthers, Seattle Seahawks, Houston Texans, and Philadelphia Eagles. At the conclusion of the pre-draft process, Harrison was projected to be a second round pick by NFL draft experts and scouts. He was ranked as the second best strong safety prospect in the draft by DraftScout.com, was ranked the third best safety by NFL analyst Mike Mayock, and was also ranked the fourth best safety in the draft by Scouts Inc.

Jacksonville Jaguars
The Jacksonville Jaguars selected Harrison in the third round with the 93rd overall pick in the 2018 NFL Draft. Harrison was the seventh safety drafted in 2018.

2018
On May 24, 2018, the Jacksonville Jaguars signed Harrison to a four-year, $3.38 million contract that includes a signing bonus of $803,032. Harrison entered his rookie season slated as the backup strong safety behind Barry Church. He was named the starter in Week 13 after Church was a healthy scratch. He was officially named the starter the rest of the season on December 14, 2018, after Church was released by the Jaguars. However, in the next game in Week 15, Harrison suffered a season-ending knee injury and was placed on injured reserve on December 17, 2018.

2019
In a Week 3 win against the Tennessee Titans in 2019, Harrison led the team with 10 tackles. The following week against the Denver Broncos, Harrison recorded his first interception of the season off Joe Flacco. In a Week 7 win against the Cincinnati Bengals, Harrison recovered a fumble forced by teammate DJ Hayden and recorded an interception.

Cleveland Browns

2020
Harrison was traded to the Cleveland Browns on September 3, 2020, in exchange for the Browns' fifth-round pick in the 2021 NFL Draft. In Week 5 against the Indianapolis Colts, Harrison intercepted a pass thrown by Philip Rivers and returned it for a 47-yard touchdown during the 32–23 win. This was Harrison's first interception as a Brown and first touchdown in the NFL. In Week 7 against the Cincinnati Bengals, Harrison led the team with 9 tackles (6 solo), sacked Joe Burrow once, and recovered a fumble lost by Burrow during the 37–34 win. Harrison was placed on injured reserve on December 1, 2020, with a shoulder injury. On December 30, 2020, Harrison was activated off of injured reserve. He was placed on the reserve/COVID-19 list by the team on January 7, 2021, and activated two days later.

2021
During Week 1 against the Kansas City Chiefs, Harrison was disqualified after appearing to step on Chiefs running back Clyde Edwards-Helaire and shoving Chiefs running backs coach Greg Lewis after Lewis shoved him. On October 18, Harrison was fined $12,128.

2022
On April 12, 2022, Harrison signed a contract to return to the Cleveland Browns.

NFL career statistics

References

External links
Cleveland Browns bio
Alabama Crimson Tide bio

1997 births
Living people
Players of American football from Tallahassee, Florida
American football safeties
Alabama Crimson Tide football players
Jacksonville Jaguars players
Cleveland Browns players